Francis Wellington Cushman (May 8, 1867 – July 6, 1909) was a U.S. Representative from Washington.

Born in Brighton, Washington County, Iowa, Cushman attended the public schools in Brighton and Pleasant Plain Academy in Pleasant Plain, Iowa.
He moved to Albany County, Wyoming, in 1885.
He was employed as a ranch hand and as a teacher.
He studied law.
He was admitted to the bar in 1889 and commenced practice in Bassett, Nebraska.
He moved to Tacoma, Washington, in 1891 and continued the practice of law.
He served as member of Troop B, First Cavalry, Washington National Guard from 1896 to 1903.

Cushman was elected as a Republican to the Fifty-sixth and to the five succeeding Congresses and served from March 4, 1899, until his death in New York City July 6, 1909.
The remains were cremated and the ashes interred in Tacoma Cemetery, Tacoma, Washington.

See also
List of United States Congress members who died in office (1900–49)

Sources

Francis W. Cushman, late a Representative from Washington, Memorial addresses delivered in the House of Representatives and Senate frontispiece 1910

1867 births
1909 deaths
People from Washington County, Iowa
Republican Party members of the United States House of Representatives from Washington (state)
19th-century American politicians